The Law of Moses, also called the Mosaic Law, primarily refers to the Torah or the first five books of the Hebrew Bible. It is the law revealed to Moses by God.

Terminology
The Law of Moses or Torah of Moses (Hebrew: , Torat Moshe, Septuagint , nómos Mōusē, or in some translations the "Teachings of Moses") is a biblical term first found in the Book of Joshua , where Joshua writes the Hebrew words of "Torat Moshe " on an altar of stones at Mount Ebal. The text continues:

The term occurs 15 times in the Hebrew Bible, a further 7 times in the New Testament, and repeatedly in Second Temple period, intertestamental, rabbinical and patristic literature.

The Hebrew word for the first five books of the Hebrew Bible, Torah (which means "law" and was translated into Greek as "nomos" or "Law") refers to the same five books termed in English "Pentateuch" (from Latinised Greek  "five books", implying the five books of Moses). According to some scholars, use of the name "Torah" to designate the "Five Books of Moses" of the Hebrew Bible is clearly documented only from the 2nd century BCE.

In modern usage, Torah can refer to the first five books of the Tanakh, as the Hebrew Bible is commonly called, to the instructions and commandments found in the 2nd to 5th books of the Hebrew Bible, and also to the entire Tanakh and even all of the Oral Law as well. Among English-speaking Christians the term "The Law" can refer to the whole Pentateuch including Genesis, but this is generally in relation to the New Testament where nomos "the Law" sometimes refers to all five books, including Genesis. This use of the Hebrew term "Torah" (law), for the first five books is considered misleading by 21st-century Christian bible scholar John Van Seters, because the Pentateuch "consists of about one half law and the other half narrative".

Law in the Ancient Near East
The "Law of Moses" in ancient Israel was different from other legal codes in the ancient Near East because transgressions were seen as offences against God rather than solely as offences against society (civil law). This contrasts with the Sumerian Code of Ur-Nammu (c. 2100–2050 BCE), and the Babylonian Code of Hammurabi (c. 1760 BCE, of which almost half concerns contract law). 

Some similarities are striking, such as in the provisions concerning a man-goring ox (Code of Hammurabi laws 250–252, Exodus 21:28–32). Some writers have posited direct influence: David P. Wright, for example, asserts that the Covenant Code is "directly, primarily, and throughout dependent upon the Laws of Hammurabi", "a creative rewriting of Mesopotamian sources ... to be viewed as an academic abstraction rather than a digest of laws". Others posit indirect influence, such as via Aramaic or Phoenician intermediaries. There is consensus that the similarities are a result of inheriting common oral traditions. Another example, the Israelite Sabbatical Year has antecedents in the Akkadian mesharum edicts granting periodic relief to the poor. An important distinction, however, is that in ancient Near East legal codes, as in more recently unearthed Ugaritic texts, an important, and ultimate, role in the legal process was assigned to the king. Ancient Israel, before the monarchical period beginning with David, was set up as a theocracy, rather than a monarchy, although God is most commonly portrayed like a king.

Hebrew Bible

Moses and authorship of the Law

According to the Hebrew Bible, Moses was the leader of early Israel out of Egypt; and traditionally the first five books of the Hebrew Bible are attributed to him, though most modern scholars believe there were multiple authors. The law attributed to Moses, specifically the laws set out in the books of Leviticus and Deuteronomy, as a consequence came to be considered supreme over all other sources of authority (any king and/or his officials), and the Levites were the guardians and interpreters of the law.

Later references to the Law in the Hebrew Bible
The Book of Kings relates how a "law of Moses" was discovered in the Temple during the reign of king Josiah (r. 641–609 BCE). 

Content
The content of the Law is spread among the books of Exodus, Leviticus, and Numbers, and then reiterated and added to in Deuteronomy. This includes:
 The Ten Commandments
 Moral laws – on murder, theft, honesty, adultery, etc.
 Social laws – on property, inheritance, marriage and divorce.
 Food laws – on what is clean and unclean, on cooking and storing food.
 Purity laws – on menstruation, seminal emissions, skin disease and mildew, etc.
 Feasts – the Day of Atonement, Passover, Feast of Tabernacles, Feast of Unleavened Bread, Feast of Weeks etc.
 Sacrifices and offerings – the sin offering, burnt offering, whole offering, heave offering, Passover sacrifice, meal offering, wave offering, peace offering, drink offering, thank offering, dough offering, incense offering, red heifer, scapegoat, first fruits, etc.
 Instructions for the priesthood and the high priest, including tithes.
 Instructions regarding the Tabernacle, and which were later applied to the Temple in Jerusalem, including those concerning the Holy of Holies containing the Ark of the Covenant (in which were the tablets of the law, Aaron's rod, the manna). Instructions  and for the construction of various altars.
 Forward looking instructions for time when Israel would demand a king.

Rabbinical Interpretation
The content of the instructions and its interpretations, the Oral Torah, was passed down orally, excerpted and codified in Rabbinical Judaism, and in the Talmud were numbered as the 613 commandments. The law given to Moses at Sinai (Hebrew Halakhah le-Moshe mi-Sinai הלכה למשה מסיני) is a halakhic distinction.

Rabbinic Judaism asserts that Moses presented the laws to the Jewish people, and that the laws do not apply to Gentiles (including Christians), with the exception of the Seven Laws of Noah, which (it teaches) apply to all people.

Christian interpretation

Orthodox Christians regard the Law of Moses as still fully in effect but transformed and fulfilled in a number of ways. Other Christians believe that only parts dealing with the moral law (as opposed to ceremonial law) are still applicable, others believe that none apply, dual-covenant theologians believe that the Old Covenant remains valid only for Jews, and a minority have the view that all parts still apply to believers in Jesus and in the New Covenant without any transformation in their character.

According to Matthew 5, Jesus says:

The Gospel of John states:

For of His fullness we have all received, and grace upon grace. For the Law was given through Moses; grace and truth were realized through Jesus Christ.

In Islam
Muslims believe Moses was one of the major prophets (and apostles) of God and the Law was one of the three major revealed scriptures known by name beside the Quran, which mentions the Law or Torah a total of eighteen times, and repeats commandments from it:

See also

 Matthew 5: Antitheses
 Moses in Islam

References

External links

Jewish Encyclopedia: Torah: Laws of the Torah

 
Ancient Near East law
Biblical phrases
Religious terminology
Biblical law